BurgerFi International, LLC (doing business as BurgerFi) is an American hamburger restaurant chain aimed at the "better burger" sector of the market. The first location was opened in February 2011 in Lauderdale-by-the-Sea, Florida.

History 

In 2015 a review in USA Today spoke of "... its upscaled statement with sleek modern restaurants giving just a hint of bar or coffeehouse atmosphere".

In 2017, the chain partnered with Beyond Meat and subsequently introduced a vegetarian/vegan burger patty called the "Beyond Burger".

Food sourcing 

In 2018, the Consumers Union graded the top 25 burger chains in the U.S. on their antibiotic use policies for beef. BurgerFi was one of the two chains that were given an "A" rating for using beef that was raised without routine use of antibiotics.

Acquisition of Anthony's Coal Fired Pizza
In November 2021, BurgerFi completed the acquisition of Florida-based pizza chain Anthony's Coal Fired Pizza, which has 61 locations in 8 US states as of June 2021.

See also 
List of hamburger restaurants

References

External links
 Official site
 Franchising page

Companies listed on the Nasdaq
Restaurants established in 2011
Fast-food hamburger restaurants
Fast-food chains of the United States
Fast-food franchises
Restaurants in Florida
1986 establishments in Florida
Fast casual restaurants
Restaurant chains in the United States